The truncate donax, abrupt wedge shell, wedge clam or coquina clam (Donax trunculus), is a bivalve species in the family Donacidae. It is native to the Mediterranean and Atlantic coasts of western Europe, as well as the Red sea, where it is consumed as a food. The wedge clam prefers to live at depths of 0-2m and in clean, fine, and well sorted sand. These clams are efficient and rapid burrowers, and their survival relies heavily on the composition of the sand they burrow in. Their burrowing times vary based on the coarseness of the sand, which reflects their prevalence in these fine-sanded environments. The wedge clam is a popular food item for human consumption, but can carry heavy metals and hydrocarbon contaminations. As they are commonly consumed raw or lightly cooked, these contaminants are commonly present at the time of consumption. Despite this, the wedge clam is an efficient bioindicator of heavy metals and hydrocarbon contaminants in their environment.

Names in other languages 
It is locally known as flion, flion tronqué, olive de mer, haricot de mer or telline (among other names) in French, lagagnon in the area of Arcaishon and Les Landes, cadelucha in the Bayonne region, which coincides with the Basque name of kadeluxa; tellin, tellina, telline, tenille or truille in the Occitan-speaking area of the Mediterranean, tellina or arsella in Italian, tellerina, tellina or escopinya francesa in Catalan (the latter variant used on Menorca), jòcula cautxa in Catalan of the Alguerès variant, coquina truncada or coquina in Spanish,cadelucha, coquina or navalliña in Galician,  conquilha or cadelinha in Portuguese and Um El-Kholol in Egyptian Arabic, etc. In Australia, a very similar shellfish is locally known as "Pippies".

References

Donacidae
Molluscs described in 1758
Taxa named by Carl Linnaeus